Mustafa Koç (born ) is a Turkish male volleyball player. He is part of the Turkey men's national volleyball team. He competed at the 2015 European Games in Baku. On club level he plays for Arkas Izmir.

See also
 Turkey at the 2015 European Games

References

1992 births
Living people
Turkish men's volleyball players
Volleyball players at the 2015 European Games
European Games competitors for Turkey
Place of birth missing (living people)
Competitors at the 2018 Mediterranean Games
Mediterranean Games competitors for Turkey